Harry Murphy is a Gaelic football manager from County Wicklow.

Career

Rathnew
Murphy won a Leinster club title with Rathnew in 2001 and also led the Wicklow side to seven County Senior Football Championship titles during his 12-year tenure, including four consecutive titles between  2000 and 2003.

He returned to the helm in 2017 and led Rathnew to another Senior title.

Wicklow
After former Kerry manager Mick O'Dwyer stepped down after a defeat to Armagh in 2011, Murphy was appointed as manager of the Wicklow senior football team on 29 August 2011.

References

1959 births
Living people
Gaelic football managers
Rathnew Gaelic footballers